Hugo Egmont Hørring (17 August 1842 – 13 February 1909) was a Danish politician, a member of the Højre political party. He was Council President of Denmark from 1897 to 1900 as the leader of the Cabinet of Hørring.

Biography
Hørring was born in Copenhagen, Denmark. He became a student in 1860 at  Borgerdydskolen in Christianshavn and received a cand.jur. degree  from the University of Copenhagen in 1868. He held various positions in the Ministry of the Interior and in 1882 became director of the Royal Greenland Trading Department (Den Kongelige Grønlandske Handel).   

Hørring retired from   government  service in April 1900. He was a Grand Cross Knight of the Order of the Dannebrog and Dannebrogsman.
Hørring died in Copenhagen during 1909 and was buried in Garrison Cemetery.

References

External links
 

1842 births
1909 deaths
People from Copenhagen
University of Copenhagen alumni
Danish Finance Ministers
Danish Interior Ministers
Danish Justice Ministers
Prime Ministers of Denmark
Politicians from Copenhagen
19th-century Danish politicians
Grand Crosses of the Order of the Dannebrog

Burials at the Garrison Cemetery, Copenhagen
Transport ministers of Denmark
Ministers for Iceland